The II Cavalry Corps can refer to the; 

II Cavalry Corps (German Empire) German formation of the First World War.
II Cavalry Corps (Grande Armée) French formation of Napoleonic Wars.
Intended name for the Desert Mounted Corps British formation of the First World War.